Thomas Morrow Reavley (June 21, 1921 – December 1, 2020) was an American jurist, who was a Senior United States circuit judge of the United States Court of Appeals for the Fifth Circuit (and the oldest serving federal judge) at the time of his death.

Education and career

Reavley was born in Quitman, Texas. He received a Bachelor of Arts degree from the University of Texas in 1942. While at the University of Texas, he was a member of the Tejas Club.  He was in the United States Navy from 1942 to 1946. As a naval lieutenant, Reavley drove President Franklin Roosevelt to Roosevelt’s meeting with Winston Churchill and Joseph Stalin at the Yalta Conference.

After World War II, he received a Juris Doctor from Harvard Law School in 1948. He later received a Master of Laws from the University of Virginia School of Law in 1983.

He was an assistant district attorney of Dallas, Texas from 1948 to 1949. He was in private practice of law in Nacogdoches, Texas from 1949 to 1951. He was a county attorney of Nacogdoches County, Texas in 1951. He was in private practice of law in Lufkin, Texas from 1951 to 1952. He was in private practice of law in Jasper, Texas from 1952 to 1955. He was Texas Secretary of State from 1955 to 1957. He was in private practice of law in Austin, Texas from 1957 to 1964. He was a Judge of the 167 Judicial District in Austin, Texas from 1964 to 1968. He was a justice of the Supreme Court of Texas from 1968 to 1977. He was in private practice of law in Austin from 1977 to 1979. He was a Special Judge of the Texas Court of Criminal Appeals in 1978.

Federal judicial service

Reavley was nominated by President Jimmy Carter to the United States Court of Appeals for the Fifth Circuit on May 17, 1979, to a new seat created by 92 Stat.1629. He was confirmed by the United States Senate on July 12, 1979, and received commission on July 13, 1979. He assumed senior status on August 1, 1990.

Personal life

Reavley married fellow Fifth Circuit judge Carolyn Dineen King in August 2004. He died on December 1, 2020 at the age of 99.

References

Sources
 
 University of Texas Law Library biography

1921 births
2020 deaths
20th-century American judges
United States Navy personnel of World War II
Harvard Law School alumni
Judges of the United States Court of Appeals for the Fifth Circuit
Military personnel from Texas
People from Quitman, Texas
Texas state court judges
Justices of the Texas Supreme Court
United States court of appeals judges appointed by Jimmy Carter
University of Texas at Austin alumni
Secretaries of State of Texas
United States Navy officers